The Freedom of Information (Amendment) Bill was a private members bill introduced to the House of Commons of the United Kingdom in 2007 which failed to become law after a sponsor for the Bill could not be found in the House of Lords.

Background and rationale

Conservative Member of Parliament David Maclean introduced the bill to ensure that MPs correspondence is exempt from freedom of information laws such as the Freedom of Information Act 2000. Maclean said of his Bill:

Although the government claimed it was neutral on the issue, private members bills rarely pass without government support, leading to claims the executive tacitly supported moves to water down freedom of information legislation. Members of the backbench committee of the Parliamentary Labour Party had emailed colleagues in support of the bill. The email said:

The proposed changes complemented Government proposals to change the way freedom of information requests are costed. Critics of the changes claimed the intention was to keep embarrassing information secret, rather than to save money.

Progress through Parliament

The bill was withdrawn after its first reading in the House of Lords.  It seemed to have failed for lack of a sponsor in the House of Lords  and due to the action of Jack Straw. 

A full account of the Parliamentary votes on 20 April 2007 and 18 May is available on Public Whip.

References

The bill
 Bill tracker
 Bill Committee website
 Campaign for Freedom of Information (contains list of news articles).

Parliamentary debates
 Second reading debate, 19 January 2007
 Committee stage debate, 7 February 2007
 Commons debate, 20 April 2007
 Prime Minister's Questions, 25 April 2007
 Report stage debate, 20 April 2007
 Jack Straw, Leader of the House of Commons, indicates support for the Bill, Business Questions 10 May 2007
 Email from the Parliamentary Labour Party's Parliamentary Committee urging Labour MPs to support the Bill

News articles
 Blair 'no comment' on info bill, 25 April 2007, BBC News
 MPs to debate info exemption bid, 27 April 2007, BBC News
 Opponents fail to block info bill, 18 May 2007, BBC News
 MPs approve information law, 18 May 2007, Epolitix

Freedom of information legislation in the United Kingdom
2007 in British law
Proposed laws of the United Kingdom